Eslam Salem Ali Mohamed (born 20 March 1989) is an Egyptian basketball player for Zamalek.

Professional career
Salem was on the Zamalek roster for the 2021 BAL season, where he started in all six games and went on to win the first-ever BAL championship.

National team career
Salem has been a member of the Egyptian national basketball team. He played in the qualifiers for the 2019 FIBA Basketball World Cup.

BAL career statistics

|-
|style="text-align:left;background:#afe6ba;"|2021†
|style="text-align:left;"|Zamalek
| 6 || 6 || 20.8 || .343 || .200 || .500 || 1.2 || 1.2 || .8 || .0 || 5.2
|- class="sortbottom"
| style="text-align:center;" colspan="2"|Career
| 6 || 6 || 20.8 || .343 || .200 || .500 || 1.2 || 1.2 || .8 || .0 || 5.2

External links
AfroBasket profile
RealGM profile

References

1989 births
Gezira basketball players
Living people
Egyptian men's basketball players
Shooting guards
Zamalek SC basketball players